Ribonucleotide reductase inhibitors are a family of anti-cancer drugs that interfere with the growth of tumor cells by blocking the formation of deoxyribonucleotides (building blocks of DNA).

Examples include:
 motexafin gadolinium.
 hydroxyurea
 fludarabine, cladribine, gemcitabine, tezacitabine, and triapine
 gallium maltolate, gallium nitrate<ref
name="PharmRev"></ref>

 Tezacitabine, Tezacitabine A chemotherapy candidate nucleotide analogue that failed in clinical trials due to on-target toxicity (febrile neutropenia).

See also
 Ribonucleotide reductase

References

External links
 Ribonucleotide reductase inhibitor entry in the public domain NCI Dictionary of Cancer Terms

Antineoplastic drugs
Oxidoreductase inhibitors